Claudio Bigagli (born 8 December 1955) is an Italian actor. He has appeared in more than 40 films and television shows since 1976. He starred in Fiorile, which was entered into the 1993 Cannes Film Festival.

Selected filmography

 The Face with Two Left Feet (1979)
 The Night of the Shooting Stars (1982)
 Via degli specchi (1982)
 Tu mi turbi (1983)
 Kaos (1984)
 It's Happening Tomorrow (1988)
 Mediterraneo (1991)
 Gangsters (1992)
 Who Wants to Kill Sara? (1992)
 Bonus malus (1993)
 Fiorile (1993)
 La bella vita (1994)
 Who Killed Pasolini? (1995)
 Stella's Favor (1996)
 Unfair Competition (2001)
 Three Steps Over Heaven (2004)
 The Roses of the Desert (2006)
 Some Say No (2011)
 L'Universale (2016)
 The Name of the Rose (2019)
 The New Pope (2020)

References

External links

1955 births
Living people
Italian male film actors
Accademia Nazionale di Arte Drammatica Silvio D'Amico alumni